In commutative and homological algebra, depth is an important invariant of rings and modules. Although depth can be defined more generally, the most common case considered is the case of modules over a commutative Noetherian local ring. In this case, the depth of a module is related with its projective dimension by the Auslander–Buchsbaum formula. A more elementary property of depth is the inequality 

 

where  denotes the Krull dimension of the module . Depth is used to define classes of rings and modules with good properties, for example, Cohen-Macaulay rings and modules, for which equality holds.

Definition 

 

By definition, the depth of a local ring  with a maximal ideal  is its -depth as a module over itself.

By a theorem of David Rees, the depth can also be characterized using the notion of a regular sequence.

Theorem (Rees) 

Depth and projective dimension 

The projective dimension and the depth of a module over a commutative Noetherian local ring are complementary to each other. This is the content of the Auslander–Buchsbaum formula, which is not only of fundamental theoretical importance, but also provides an effective way to compute the depth of a module. 

Depth zero rings 

A commutative Noetherian local ring  has depth zero if and only if its maximal ideal  is an associated prime, or, equivalently, when there is a nonzero element  of  such that  (that is,  annihilates ).  This means, essentially, that the closed point is an embedded component.

For example, the ring  (where  is a field), which represents a line with an embedded double point at the origin, has depth zero at the origin, but dimension one: this gives an example of a ring which is not Cohen–Macaulay.

References 
 
 Winfried Bruns; Jürgen Herzog, Cohen–Macaulay rings. Cambridge Studies in Advanced Mathematics, 39. Cambridge University Press, Cambridge, 1993. xii+403 pp. 

Module theory
Commutative algebra